Samuel Muturi Mugo (born 2 May 1986) is a Kenyan athlete who specialises in long distance running, particularly the marathon. He also competes under the name Sammy Mugo.

Mugo moved to Japan to become a professional athlete and began participating in senior competitions in 2003. He started out as a 5000 and 10,000 metres track runner and finished in the top three in the Shizuoka International 10,000 m from 2003 to 2005, improving his best time every year. He began competing in longer road races from 2005 onwards, breaking into the top ten at the 2005 Sapporo Half Marathon, and running as part of the winning Konica Minolta team at the All-Japan Corporate Team Ekiden Championships. He made his marathon debut at the Hamburg Marathon and, although strong in the first half of the race, he faded away in the latter stages and finished in twelfth place. He improved at the Cologne Marathon and recorded a best of 2:11:27 to take second place behind Daniel Kirwa Too.

He focused on just marathoning in 2008: he recorded a personal best at the Tiberias Marathon and was rewarded with his first ever win at the Porto Marathon in another personal record. He built upon this in 2009 by winning the Xiamen International Marathon in a course record time, taking second place in the Rock 'n' Roll San Diego Marathon, and recording a new best of 2:08:20 to win the Beijing Marathon. The next marathon he entered was the Boston Marathon in 2010, but he failed to finish as bronchial trouble forced him out of the race at the 25 km mark. Poor weather affected his attempt to defend his Beijing title and he finished sixth in one of the slowest races of the course's history. He returned again the following year and in spite of a slow start, he pulled back into second place and clocked a time of 2:09:43 hours behind Francis Kiprop.

Personal bests 

All information taken from IAAF profile.

References

External links

marathoninfo

1986 births
Living people
Kenyan male long-distance runners
Kenyan male marathon runners